Victor Hănescu and Horia Tecău were the defending champions but decided not to participate.
David Marrero and Fernando Verdasco won the title by defeating Marcel Granollers and Marc López 6–3, 6–4 in the final.

Seeds

Draw

Draw

References
 Main Draw

Abierto Mexicano Telcel - Doubles
2012 Abierto Mexicano Telcel